Alpha value (designated α value) may refer to:
Significance level in statistics
Alpha compositing